The Scout and Guide movement in Syria is served by
 Scouts of Syria, member of both the World Organization of the Scout Movement and the World Association of Girl Guides and Girl Scouts
 Scouts Assyriens, serving Christians from Mesopotamia
 Homenetmen, serving Armenian youth  

Syrian Scouts and Guides in Turkish exile are served by the Syrian Private Scouts

See also